The 2022–23 Texas A&M–Corpus Christi Islanders women's basketball team represents Texas A&M University–Corpus Christi in the 2022–23 NCAA Division I women's basketball season. The Islanders are led by eleventh-year head coach Royce Chadwick, and play their home games at the American Bank Center and the Dugan Wellness Center, as members of the Southland Conference.

Previous season
The Islanders finished the 2021–22 season 19–10 overall, 11–3 in Southland play to finish in second place. Their season ended as the No. 2 seed in the Southland women's tournament where they were defeated by Southeastern in the semifinal round.

Media
Home games are broadcast on ESPN+.  Video streaming of all non-televised home games and audio for all road games is available at GoIslanders.com.

Preseason polls

Southland Conference Poll
The Southland Conference released its preseason poll on October 25, 2022. Receiving 11 first place votes and 148 votes overall, the Islanders were picked to finish first in the conference.

Preseason All Conference
Makinna Serrata and Alecia Westbrook were selected as members of the Preseason All Conference first team.

Roster

Schedule and results

|-
!colspan=9 style=| Non-conference exhibition season

|-
!colspan=9 style=| Non-conference regular season

|-
!colspan=9 style=| Southland Conference regular season

|-
!colspan=9 style=| 2023 Jersey Mike's Subs Southland Basketball Tournament
|-

|-
!colspan=9 style=| WNIT
|-

|-

Source:

See also
 2022–23 Texas A&M–Corpus Christi Islanders men's basketball team

References

Texas A&M–Corpus Christi Islanders women's basketball seasons
Texas AandM-Corpus Christi
Texas AandM-Corpus Christi Islanders basketball
Texas AandM-Corpus Christi Islanders basketball
Texas AandM-Corpus Christi Islanders